Oxyomus is a genus of aphodiine dung beetles in the family Scarabaeidae. There are at about 25 described species in Oxyomus, found in Europe, Asia, Africa, and North America.

Species
These 25 species belong to the genus Oxyomus:

 Oxyomus aciculatus Schmidt, 1909
 Oxyomus arunae Stebnicka, 1985
 Oxyomus bremeri Stebnicka, 1982
 Oxyomus cameratus Schmidt, 1908
 Oxyomus costulatus (Fairmaire, 1849)
 Oxyomus debilis (Harold, 1877)
 Oxyomus inaequalis Lansberge, 1886
 Oxyomus ishidai Nakane, 1977
 Oxyomus jucundulus (Péringuey, 1901)
 Oxyomus kiuchii Masumoto, 1991
 Oxyomus kocoti Minkina, 2018
 Oxyomus malgorzatae Minkina, 2016
 Oxyomus mariateresae Dellacasa, Dellacasa & Gordon, 2014
 Oxyomus masumotoi Nomura, 1973
 Oxyomus mencli Minkina, 2016
 Oxyomus miliaris (Schmidt, 1908)
 Oxyomus nanxiensis Masumoto, Kiuchi & Wang, 2018
 Oxyomus nowaki Minkina, 2016
 Oxyomus nubigenus Petrovitz, 1968
 Oxyomus setosopunctatus Schmidt, 1911
 Oxyomus simillimus Schmidt, 1908
 Oxyomus sylvestris (Scopoli, 1763)
 Oxyomus taipingensis Masumoto, Kiuchi & Wang, 2014
 Oxyomus thailandicus Masumoto, 1991
 † Oxyomus nearcticus Wickham, 1914

References

Scarabaeidae
Scarabaeidae genera
Taxa named by Pierre François Marie Auguste Dejean